Jonas is a genus of crustaceans belonging to the family Corystidae.

The species of this genus are found in Japan, Malesia and Australia.

Species:

Jonas choprai 
Jonas distinctus 
Jonas formosae 
Jonas indicus 
Jonas kalpakkamensis 
Jonas leuteanus 
Jonas macrophthalmus

References

Crabs
Decapod genera